Thiruvallur division is a revenue division in the Tiruvallur district of Tamil Nadu, India. It comprises the taluks of Uthukkotai, Tiruvallur and Poonamallee.

References 

 

Tiruvarur district